Hiralal Bhakat College, established in 1986, is a general degree college in Nalhati. It offers undergraduate courses in arts and commerce. It is affiliated to University of Burdwan.

Departments

Arts and Commerce

Bengali
English
History
Political Science
Philosophy
Commerce
Geography
Arabic & Urdu

Accreditation
The college is recognized by the University Grants Commission (UGC).

See also

References

External links
 

Colleges affiliated to University of Burdwan
Educational institutions established in 1986
Universities and colleges in Birbhum district
1986 establishments in West Bengal